The 2019 Saudi Super Cup was the 6th edition of the Saudi Super Cup, an annual football match played between the winners of the previous season's Saudi Pro League and King's Cup. It was played on 4 January 2020 by Al-Nassr, the winners of the 2018–19 Saudi Pro League, and Al-Taawoun, the winners of the 2019 King Cup. The match was held at the King Abdullah Sports City in Jeddah, Saudi Arabia for the first time. Al-Nassr won 5–4 on a penalty shoot-out after a 1–1 draw at the end of extra time, securing their first title in the competition.

Venue
The King Abdullah Sports City, also known as the Jewel Stadium, was announced as the venue of the final on 11 November 2019. This was the first time the King Abdullah Sports City hosted the final and was the third time it was hosted in Saudi Arabia.

The King Abdullah Sports City was built in 2012, opened in 2014 as the home of Al-Ahli and Al-Ittihad. Its current capacity is 62,345, and the record attendance was the opening match which was the 2014 King Cup final. This final marked the seventh final to be played in the stadium following the 2014, 2015, 2016, 2017 and 2018 finals of the King Cup and the 2018 Supercoppa Italiana.

Background

This will be Al-Nassr's third appearance in the competition and their first in 4 years. Al-Nassr finished as runners-up in both the 2014 and 2015 editions of the Super Cup. On the other hand, this will be Al-Taawoun's first appearance in the competition.

Both clubs will be looking to win the Saudi Super Cup for the first time. Al-Nassr had failed to win in their two previous appearances in the competition. Al-Taawoun will be making their debut in the competition and will be the seventh team to participate in the competition.

Al-Nassr qualified by winning the 2018–19 Saudi Professional League on the final matchday by defeating Al-Batin 2–1. Al-Taawoun qualified by winning their first King Cup title by defeating defending champions Al-Ittihad 2–1 in the final. The two teams met twice in the 2018–19 season with both teams winning once.

The match was originally set to take place in Abu Dhabi on 24 January 2020. However, on 11 November 2019, the Saudi FF announced that match would take place on 4 January 2020 in Jeddah to accommodate the Spanish Super Cup taking place in the same week and same venue.

Match

Details

{| width="100%"
|valign="top" width="40%"|

Statistics

See also
 2018–19 Saudi Professional League
 2019 King Cup
 2019 King Cup Final

References 

Saudi Super Cup
2019–20 in Saudi Arabian football
Sports competitions in Saudi Arabia
January 2020 sports events in Asia
Al-Taawoun FC matches
Al Nassr FC matches
Saudi Super Cup 2019